Ronan Browne is an Irish musician and composer who plays the Irish pipes. He plays and sings with the band Cran, and also played in a 40-year duet with Peter O'Loughlin. He was the original piper with both Riverdance and the Afro Celt Sound System.

Browne has also contributed music to the film soundtracks of Circle of Friends,  Rob Roy, Robin of Locksley, The Secret of Roan Inish, Streets of Gold, Gangs of New York, and the TV series Bringing It All Back Home.

Early years
Browne was born in Dublin in 1965 into a musical background.  His grandmother, Delia Murphy, wrote, recorded and popularised many Irish songs in the 1930s and 1940s. Musicians such as Séamus Ennis, Willie Clancy and Denis Murphy were regular visitors to Browne's family home over the years. He began playing the pipes at the age of seven, his main influences being pipers Willie Clancy, Johnny Doran and Séamus Ennis, and fiddlers Denis Murphy and Tommy Potts.

Career
Browne has toured extensively in Europe and in the US, as well as playing in Russia, India, Australia, Israel, New Zealand, Hong Kong and Japan.  He gives master classes throughout the world.

He has been involved in many album recordings since his first venture into the studio in 1982 and has collaborated with many of the top artists playing traditional Irish music, classical, pop, jazz and Country.  These include people such as Anúna, Dónal Lunny, Finbar Wright, Alan Stivell, The Indigo Girls, Tommy Hayes, Sean Tyrrell, Bill Whelan, Elvis Costello, Nightnoise, Michael Kamen, Paul Brady, Bill Laswell, Sinéad O'Connor, Peter Gabriel and Deep Forest.

After releasing the easy-listening album Celtic Moods in 1997, Browne released a solo traditional CD The Wynd You Know in 2001, with Claddagh Records.

Duet with Peter O'Loughlin
Browne's friendship and musical collaboration with Peter O'Loughlin spanned the 40 years from their initial meeting in 1977 to Peter's death on 22 October 2017. Their strong combination of mid-19th century flat-pitch pipes and tuned-down fiddle, playing the old dance music of Ireland, makes for a rare and thoroughly enjoyable evening's entertainment. They recorded 3 albums: 'The South West Wind' (1988), 'Touch Me if You Dare' (2002), and 'The Legacy (2016).

Cran
Browne is a member of the group Cran with Seán Corcoran and Desi Wilkinson.  Cran has released five CDs and tour worldwide.
The core of their repertoire is native Irish material – dance music or slow airs on flute and pipes, and vocals ranging from the highly ornamented sean-nós songs of Conamara to the rollicking port a' bhéil or mouth music of Donegal. Their Hiberno-English song repertoire (songs from Ireland in English) covers the entire gamut from the old story-telling "long ballads" to lively comic songs of "pure divilment and rascality". They also include material from the related Scots-Gaelic tradition and from the other Atlantic Celts, the Bretons.

Cran have released five CDs: [The Crooked Stair (1993, reissued 2005); Black Black Black (1998); Lover’s Ghost (2000); Music from the Edge of the World (2002); Dally and Stray (2014)].

Since their teens, Browne and fiddle player Kevin Glackin have played as a duet.  Kevin, regularly joins Cran for recordings along with Tríona Ní Dhomhnaill (Bothy Band).

Riverdance
Browne was the original piper for the Eurovision interval performance of "Riverdance" in 1994 and his recording has featured in almost every show since.  He chose not to join the teeming cast when the show went on the road, preferring instead to concentrate on his personal projects and to leave the touring to pipers with more time on their hands.

Afro Celt Sound System
In the mid-1990s, Browne was asked if he would like to join a project which was starting up revolving around Peter Gabriel's 2nd "World Music Recording Week".  Musicians converged from all over the planet to ramble from project to project being recorded in up 7 recording setups in Real World Studios.  Out of this intense meeting of musicians was born the Afro Celt Sound System which went on to become Real World's most successful venture.  It was a meeting of African and Irish musicians in the convivial company of some of the top London programmers.

The Afro Celts toured the world and Browne remained with the band for the first two albums, writing and recording in various locations between Ireland and England.  Tracks were licensed for countless documentaries, ads and films, the strangest of which was Farrah Fawcett sculpting nude in a Playboy video to the sound of Browne's opening track on the 1st Afro Celt CD.

Performances
Browne has played many prestigious concerts in Ireland and abroad as a solo musician and has also been a guest member to a wide variety of groups.

Although best known as a traditional musician, Browne is also keenly interested in exploring other musical genres particularly in film and television. He has written and performed music for fashion shows in London and Paris by designers Lainey Keogh and John Rocha.

Teaching
Browne has been teaching the pipes, flute and whistle worldwide for the last 25 years and has recently developed a much sought-after music appreciation/listening class.  In 2005 an Arts Council DEIS grant enabled him to make his class completely portable and has proved a huge addition to his teaching capabilities.

Film Music and Television
Along with Michael Kamen, Browne composed the soundtrack for the documentary film The Dolphin's Gift, directed by Kim Kindersley.  More recently, the two of them collaborated on the score to Circle of Friends, the film dramatisation of Maeve Binchy's novel.

Browne has also contributed music to the film soundtracks of Robin of Lcksley, Rob Roy, Fierce Creatures, The Secret of Roan Inish, Streets of Gold and Gangs of New York.

On Anjelica Huston's Mrs. Browne, Browne was Traditional Irish Music Director.

He composed and recorded scores for the audio-visual displays at the National 1798 Visitor Centre in Enniscorthy, at the Waterford Treasures museum and at King John's Castle in Limerick city.

TG4, the Irish TV station, commissioned Browne to write the music for the daily news program Nuacht, a six-part drama series Geibheann and the drama An Gaeilgeoir Nocht. Browne appears regularly on Irish music and magazine programmes on national television and radio.  He has also played for numerous television advertisements.

He appeared on ABC Network's 65 million-audience Good Morning America playing the Uilleann Pipes with Dónal Lunny, Nollaig Casey and Arty McGlynn.  He played on the theme music to the six-part series Bringing It All Back Home – an independent television programme dealing with the influence of Irish music on American folk and contemporary music.

Browne featured on Hummingbird's Rivers of Sound, which explored many aspects of traditional Irish music.

Theatre
Browne worked with Tommy Hayes, on the writing and performance of music for the Abbey Theatre productions of The Playboy of the Western World and Macbeth.  He joined forces again with Tommy and dancer Cindy Cummings to give off-beat improvised performances.

The Olympia Theatre performance of The Tailor and Ansty with Anna Manahan and Frank Kelly saw Browne playing music and acting a small role.

Browne's version of the Blasket Island air Port na bPucaí was chosen by Limerick's Daghda dance group for their part in the huge Famine commemoration held in Millstreet in 1997.

Selected discography

Solo
 Celtic Moods (1997) 
 The Wynd You Know (2001) – Traditional pipes solo CD
 Salute to the Brave (2005) – with the Patriot Corps

With Cran
 The Crooked Stair (1995/2006)
 Black, Black, Black (1998) – with Shel Talmy
 Lover's Ghost (2000)
 Music from the Edge of the World (2003)
 Dally And Stray (2014)

With Peter O'Loughlin
 The South West Wind (1988)
 Touch me if you Dare (2002)
 The Thing Itself (2004) – with Maeve Donnelly
 Geantraí (2006) – TV performance (CD & DVD) 
 The Legacy (2015)

With Afro Celt Sound System
 Volume 1: Sound Magic (1996)
 Volume 2: Release (1999)
 Capture 1995-2010 (2010)

With Transatlantic Sessions
 Transatlantic Sessions 2 (1998)
 Transatlantic Sessions 3 (2007)
 Transatlantic Sessions 4 (2009)

With others
 Taobh na Greine/Under the Sun (1994) – with Seosaimhín Ní Bheaglaoich and Dónal Lunny 
 Branohm/The Voyage of Bran (1994) – with Maire Breathnach
 Riverdance: Music from the Show (1995)
 Secret of Roan Inish (1995) – soundtrack to the film
 River of Sound (1995) – Accompanying the TV series
 When I Was Young (1996) – with Pádraigín Ní Uallacháin & Len Graham
 Celtic Tenors (1998) – Volume 1
 The Crossing (1999) – with Tim O'Brien
 Celtic Tenors (2000)  – Volume 2
 Journey – Best of Dónal Lunny (2001)
 The Irish Tenors (2001) – Ellis Island Guest
 Celtic Tenors (2002)  – Volume 3 (So Strong: "Pipes on The Green Fields Of France" and "Mull of Kintyre")
 Celtic Tiger (2005)  – Soundtrack to Flatley's show

External links
Official CRAN Website
Ronan Browne Interview
 Varlet, Philippe. Review of The Wynd You Know. First published in Celtic Grooves Newsletter. irishmusicreview.com.  
 Walsh, Tom (2001). Review of The Wynd You Know. mustrad.org.uk.
 Wallis, Geoff. Review of Touch Me if You Dare. First published in fRoots magazine. irishmusicreview.com.
 Wallis, Geoff. Review of 3 CRAN Albums: Black Black Black, Lover’s Ghost, and Music from the Edge of the World. First published as a "Classic Album" review in Songlines magazine. irishmusicreview.com 
 Wallis, Geoff. Review of re-issued CRAN's first CD The Crooked Stair. First published ?. irishmusicreview.com.

Irish uilleann pipers
1965 births
Living people
Musicians from Dublin (city)
Afro Celt Sound System members
20th-century Irish musicians
21st-century Irish musicians
Claddagh Records artists